Joseph Denton "Jay" Miller (May 5, 1922 – March 23, 1996) was an American record producer and songwriter from Louisiana, whose Cajun, swamp blues, and swamp pop recordings influenced American popular culture.

Biography 
Miller was born in Iota, Louisiana, on May 5, 1922, and spent many childhood years in El Campo, Texas. He lived most of his life in Crowley, where in the late 1930s he played guitar with several Cajun bands, including the Four Aces, the Rice City Ramblers, and the Daylight Creepers. In 1946, he began to record Cajun musicians, using a studio belonging to the record producer Cosimo Matassa, in New Orleans. In 1946, his new label, Fais Do Do Records, recorded most notably the string band Happy, Doc, and the Boys (Happy Fats and Oran "Doc" Guidry). After a few records, in 1947, he changed the name of the label to Feature Records, which recorded Cajun musicians such as Amidie Breaux, Aldus Roger, Austin Pete and various other country musicians. Later, Miller would create and record for smaller labels for different genres of music: Rocko Records (originally Rocket), Zynn Records, Showtime Records, Rebel Records, Kajun Records, Cajun Classics, Blues Unlimited, Swade, Excello, Spot, Action, Kay, Ringo, Tribute, and French "Hits".

In the 1950s he began to record swamp pop artists, including King Karl, Guitar Gable, Warren Storm, Rod Bernard, and Johnnie Allan, among others. In 1952, Miller wrote the lyrics to "It Wasn't God Who Made Honky Tonk Angels" (an answer song to the recent Hank Thompson hit "The Wild Side of Life"). The song, as recorded by Kitty Wells, became gold and stayed number 1 for several weeks.

Around this time he also began to record swamp blues artists, such as Lightnin' Slim, Lazy Lester, Lonesome Sundown and Slim Harpo. Miller produced Harpo's "I'm a King Bee" and "Rainin' in My Heart", significant swamp blues recordings later covered, respectively, by the Rolling Stones and by Neil Young. From 1962 to 1965, Miller also recorded sides by Silas Hogan, until Miller argued with the new owners of Excello Records and his input to that label dried up.

Miller's recording studio attracted a handful of mainstream recording artists, including Paul Simon, who used the studio to record "That Was Your Mother", a track from his acclaimed album Graceland, and John Fogerty, who traveled to Crowley to record a cover of "My Toot Toot", by the zydeco musician Rockin' Sidney.

Miller's songwriting credits include "It Wasn't God Who Made Honky Tonk Angels".

Although he claimed to be a segregationist, Miller nonetheless used interracial studio bands during the Jim Crow era, when black and white musicians in the South were not permitted to mingle onstage or elsewhere in public. He professed to enjoy African-American blues music more than any other musical genre, and he wrote blues songs under the pseudonym "Jay West" (a name he used to disguise his race). Yet in the 1960s he also produced and released several racist recordings on his own Reb Rebel label, most notably those of Johnny Rebel (the pseudonym of a local Cajun/country musician, Clifford "Pee Wee" Trahan).

Miller died in Crowley, on March 23, 1996, after complications following quadruple bypass surgery. The Jay D. Miller Award, granted by the Louisiana Blues Hall of Fame, is named for him.

Recorded songs 
Songs by Miller, covered by other artists:
 "I Made A Big Mistake" – covered by Iry LeJeune.
 "Diggy Liggy Lo" – covered by Doug Kershaw and many others.
 "I Hear You Knocking" – covered by Dwight Yoakam and The Fabulous Thunderbirds.
 "I'm A Lover Not A Fighter" – covered by The Kinks

Compilation discography 
 Acadian All Star Special: The Pioneering Cajun Recordings of J.D. Miller (BCD 17206-1/2/3 CK Bear Family Records, 2011)

References

Sources 
John Broven, South to Louisiana: The Music of the Cajun Bayous (Gretna, La.: Pelican, 1983).

External links 

Record producers from Texas
Songwriters from Louisiana
People from El Campo, Texas
People from Iota, Louisiana
Swamp pop music
1922 births
1996 deaths
Place of death missing
American folk musicians
Cajun musicians
20th-century American musicians
20th-century American businesspeople
Songwriters from Texas
20th-century American male musicians
American male songwriters